The High Park Club is a tennis and curling club in Toronto, Ontario, Canada. The club is located on Indian Road, just east of High Park. Prior to 1910, curling took place on Grenadier Pond in High Park. The club organized and built its clubhouse in 1911, making it one of Toronto's oldest curling clubs.

Provincial curling championships
2009 - Kelly Cochrane, Kelly Scissons, Brenna Cochrane, Lisa Rawlings: Provincial and National Curling club champions
2001 - Bobby Reid, Brad Russell, Phil Sager, Mark Stanfield: Junior Men's
1998 - Bobby Reid, Megan Balsdon, Mark Stanfield, Kelly Cochrane: Bantam Mixed
1975 - Dave Reid, Pat Reid, Terry Lindsey, Martha Lindsey: Mixed

In addition, William Scott, Ed Peaker, Thomas Wright and Fred Lucas represented "Toronto" at the 1927 MacDonald Brier.

Notes

External links
The High Park Club

Curling clubs in Canada
Sports venues in Toronto
Sports clubs established in 1911
1911 establishments in Ontario